Bridget Vallence is an Australian politician. She was elected to the Victorian Parliament in November 2018 to represent the Evelyn District and is the Shadow Minister for Industry, Manufacturing, Innovation, Medical Research, and the Digital Economy since September 2021.

Previously, Vallence was the Shadow Minister for Environment & Climate Change, Youth Affairs, and Equality between March 2020 and September 2021, and the Shadow Cabinet Secretary and Shadow Assistant Minister for Industry between December 2018 and March 2020.

She has served on Parliament’s Public Accounts and Estimates Committee and is currently a Board Member of VicHealth, a statutory foundation that promotes health and disease prevention.

Prior to entering Parliament, Vallence worked for 16 years in the automotive industry as a procurement professional in both the manufacturing and retail sectors in Australian, Asian, and global markets. She holds a Bachelor of Arts and Bachelor of Commerce (Honours) from the University of Melbourne.

References

Year of birth missing (living people)
Living people
Liberal Party of Australia members of the Parliament of Victoria
Members of the Victorian Legislative Assembly
Women members of the Victorian Legislative Assembly
21st-century Australian politicians
University of Melbourne alumni politicians
21st-century Australian women politicians